Joseph Gordon-Levitt is an American actor, filmmaker, and entrepreneur who has received various accolades throughout his career.

As a child, Gordon-Levitt appeared in the films A River Runs Through It (1992) and Angels in the Outfield (1994), which earned him a Young Artist Award and a Saturn Award nomination respectively, and in the television series 3rd Rock from the Sun (1996–2001), for which he received three nominations at the Screen Actors Guild Awards.

After a short break, he decided to return to acting with more challenging roles like the coming-to-age drama Mysterious Skin (2004), for which he obtained a Gotham Award nomination for Breakthrough Actor. In 2009, he starred in the romantic comedy (500) Days of Summer, a performance that earned him nominations for the Golden Globe Award for Best Actor – Motion Picture Musical or Comedy and the Independent Spirit Award for Best Male Lead. Two years later, he was nominated for a second Golden Globe Award for the black comedy 50/50. In 2013, he wrote and directed Don Jon, a comedy-drama film that was released to critical acclaim, earning him an Independent Spirit Award nomination for Best First Screenplay. In 2020, he starred in the legal drama The Trial of the Chicago 7, for which he won the Critics' Choice Movie Award for Best Acting Ensemble and the Screen Actors Guild Award for Outstanding Performance by a Cast in a Motion Picture.

Gordon-Levitt is the founder of the online media platform HitRecord, whose projects such as HitRecord on TV (2014–15) and Create Together (2020) won him two Primetime Emmy Awards in the category of Outstanding Interactive Program. He received a Tony Award nomination for Best Special Theatrical Event for producing the Broadway show Slava's Snowshow (2008).

Awards and nominations

Notes

References

External links
  

Gordon-Levitt, Joseph